Eira Margot Helene Stenberg (born April 8, 1943, in Tampere) is a Finnish playwright and writer and the recipient of the J. H. Erkko Award in 1966 for her debut collection of poetry Kapina huoneessa, and the Eino Leino Prize in 2007.

References

Finnish writers
Finnish women writers
Recipients of the Eino Leino Prize
1943 births
Living people